Frederick William Oliver (4 January 1836 – 7 July 1899) was an English first-class cricketer active 1855–57 who played for Surrey. He was born in Mayfair and died in Earl's Court. He played in ten first-class matches.

References

1836 births
1899 deaths
English cricketers
Surrey cricketers
Marylebone Cricket Club cricketers
Oxford University cricketers
People educated at Westminster School, London
Alumni of Christ Church, Oxford